Suddhodhan is a Rural Municipality (Nepali :शुद्धोधन गाउँपालिकाको ) in Rupandehi District, Lumbini Province, Nepal. On 12 March 2017, the government of Nepal implemented a new local administrative structure, with the implementation of the new local administrative structure, VDCs have been replaced with municipal and Village Councils. Suddhodhan is one of these 753 local units.

References 

Kapilvastu District
Lumbini Province
Rural municipalities of Nepal established in 2017
Rural municipalities in Kapilvastu District